Alyssa Ayres is the Dean of The George Washington University's Elliott School of International Affairs, the first woman to hold the post. She was also a Senior Fellow at the Council on Foreign Relations for India, Pakistan, and Southeast Asia from October 2013 to February 2021. After her appointment as dean of the Elliott School of International Affairs, she has taken a position as an adjunct senior fellow at the Council on Foreign Relations. Her book Our Time Has Come: How India is Making Its Place in the World, was published in January 2018 and appeared on the “Summer 2018: Politics” list in the Financial Times.

Early life and education
Ayres earned an Artium Baccalaureus in Indian Studies in 1992 from Harvard College. After that, she studied at the University of Chicago, earning both a master's degree Doctorate of Philosophy in Cultural History.

Career
Ayres began her career as an interpreter for the International Committee of the Red Cross in Jammu and Kashmir in the mid-to-late 1990s, before taking a position at the Asia Society as the assistant director of South and Central Asia Policy Programs in 1998. From 2004 to 2007, Ayres was the deputy director of the Center for the Advanced Study of India at the University of Pennsylvania.

In 2008, worked as a founding Director for India and South Asia at McLarty Associates, a Washington, D.C.-based foreign affairs and trade consultancy. In 2010, Ayres was named Deputy Assistant Secretary of State for South and Central Asian Affairs, serving under Assistant Secretary Richard Boucher.

After leaving the State Department in 2013, Ayres joined the Council on Foreign Relations as a Senior Fellow at the Council on Foreign Relations for India, Pakistan, and Southeast Asia, where she was a vocal advocate for strong Indo-American relations.

In February 2021, Ayres was picked as the dean of The George Washington University's Elliott School of International Affairs, following the departure of Ambassador Reuben E. Brigety II. Ayres is the first woman to serve as head of the institution.

Publications
 Our Time Has Come: How India is Making Its Place in the World (Oxford University Press, 2018)  
 Working With a Rising India: A Joint Venture for the New Century (Council on Foreign Relations Press; Task force edition, 2015)  
 Power Realignments in Asia: China, India, and the United States (SAGE Publications Pvt, 2015)  
 Speaking Like a State: Language and Nationalism in Pakistan (Cambridge University Press, 2009)  
 India Briefing: Takeoff at Last? (Routledge, 2005)  
 India Briefing: Quickening the Pace of Change (M.E. Sharpe, 2002)

References 

Living people
Harvard College alumni
University of Chicago alumni
George Washington University deans
Year of birth missing (living people)